The 2005–06 New Zealand Football Championship was the second season of the New Zealand Football Championship. The final was won by Auckland City, who defended the title they won in 2005.

New Format 
In the regular season, all teams played each other three times, as before. But the playoff stage was changed slightly, with the top five teams now going through to the playoffs (as opposed to the previous three).

Team locations

League table

Finals
In this season's extended playoff system, the games are broken up into several rounds.

Bracket

Round 1
The second place team plays the third place team in Game 1; and fourth place plays fifth place in Game 2. The second and fourth placed teams get home advantage. The winners of each game progress to Round 2, as does the loser of Game 1. The Game 2 loser is eliminated.

 Game 1: April-2nd: YoungHeart Manawatu 0-0 Canterbury United  (AET, Canterbury won on penalties 5-4)
 Game 2: April-2nd: Team Wellington 2-2 Otago United (AET, Wellington won on penalties 4-1)

Round 2
Auckland City, as Premiers, receive a bye straight to Round 2 where they face the winner from Game 1. The loser of Game 1 gets a second chance by going into Round 2 to face the Game 2 winner.

 Game 3: April-8th: Auckland City FC 3-0 Canterbury United
 Game 4: April-9th: YoungHeart Manawatu 2-3 Team Wellington

The winner of Game 3 (Auckland) now goes into the Grand Final - and with home advantage. The loser of Game 3 (Canterbury) gets a second chance to make the Grand Final by playing the winner of Game 4 (Wellington). The Game 4 loser is eliminated.

Round 3
 Game 5: April-15th: Canterbury United 2-1 Team Wellington

Canterbury, as winners, go on to face Auckland City in the Grand Final.

Grand Final
 April-22nd: Auckland City 3-3 Canterbury United (AET, Auckland won on penalties 4-3)

Auckland City are the champions of the 2005–06 New Zealand Football Championship and, along with league runners up YoungHeart Manawatu, will go on to represent New Zealand in the Oceania Club Championship 2006

See also
 New Zealand Football Championship

External links
 Official Website

New Zealand Football Championship seasons
1
New
New